The Europeada is a football tournament for indigenous and national minorities in Europe, and is organized by the Federal Union of European Nationalities. The first edition was played in 2008 in Surselva, Switzerland.

Men's winners

Women's winners

References

Non-FIFA football competitions